The Curtiss XP-71 was a 1941 American proposal for an exceptionally large heavy fighter design. It was intended to serve as an extreme-range interceptor and escort fighter. While significant progress was made in the design phase, no prototypes were ever built, and the design was abandoned in 1943.

Design and development
The proposed aircraft was to have a pressurized cockpit. Power would be provided by two Pratt & Whitney R-4360 Wasp Major radial engines each driving a set of pusher contra-rotating propellers.

Based on studies of heavy, long-range fighters that had been undertaken prior to the American involvement in World War II, the United States Army Air Forces initially ordered two prototypes in November 1941. The major role for the proposed aircraft was to act as an "escort" fighter to protect heavy bombers that would have to operate over occupied Europe even if Britain was conquered.

Developed around two turbocharged  R-4360s driving pusher propellers, the XP-71 would have been the largest fighter aircraft built in the war.

The final XP-71 design would have been larger than the contemporary B-25 and was considered a complex industrial project that would have taxed the resources of the Curtiss company as it was evident that development time would stretch out well beyond the projected need for the type. 

At the time, Curtiss facilities were completely committed to producing existing aircraft; due to the need to keep their production lines open for the current types on order and with shifting combat requirements, the USAAF reconsidered the need for the project before prototype construction had begun. As conditions changed and it was clear that Britain would continue to be available for forward bases, the requirement for the advanced fighter project led to the cancellation of the XP-71 in early 1942.

Specifications (XP-71, as designed)

See also

References

Notes

Bibliography

 Dorr, Robert F. and Donald, David. Fighters of the United States Air Force. London: Temple, 1990. .
 Jones, Lloyd S. U.S. Fighters: Army-Air Force 1925 to 1980s. Fallbrook, California: Aero Publishers, Inc., 1975. .

External links

P-71
Twin-engined pusher aircraft
High-wing aircraft
Cancelled military aircraft projects of the United States
Aircraft with contra-rotating propellers
Twin-engined piston aircraft